Ian Christopher Alexander (born 14 April 1947) is a former Australian politician who was a member of the Legislative Assembly of Western Australia from 1987 to 1993, representing the seat of Perth. He was elected as a representative of the Labor Party, but in 1991 left the party to sit as an independent.

Early life
Alexander was born in Leeds, England, to Elsie Louise (née Chatterley) and Solomon Schechter Alexander. His father was a grandson of Solomon Schechter, a Romanian Jew who later became a Jewish community leader in the United States. Alexander and his family arrived in Western Australia in April 1951, where he attended Guildford Grammar School. He went on to the University of Western Australia, graduating with a Bachelor of Arts in geography in 1968 and a Master of Arts in 1970. Alexander subsequently completed a Master of Philosophy in town planning in 1972, at the University of London, and then a doctorate in urban research in 1981, at the Australian National University. Prior to entering politics, he worked as a lecturer at the Western Australian Institute of Technology (WAIT).

Politics
Alexander served on the Perth City Council from 1982 to 1985. He had joined the Labor Party in 1972, and was elected to state parliament at the 1987 Perth by-election, caused by the resignation of Terry Burke. Alexander retained his seat at the 1989 state election, albeit with a significantly reduced margin. However, in March 1991 he resigned from the Labor Party to sit as an independent, citing "frequent breaches of the party's basic principles and platforms". Alexander did not contest his seat at the 1993 election, and after leaving parliament returned to work as a university lecturer at the University of Western Australia. He joined the Greens Western Australia in 1995, and at the 2001 state election unsuccessfully stood as the Greens candidate for the seat of Fremantle.

See also
 Independent politicians in Australia

References

1947 births
Living people
Alumni of the University of London
Australian Labor Party members of the Parliament of Western Australia
Australian National University alumni
Australian people of Romanian-Jewish descent
Academic staff of Curtin University
English emigrants to Australia
Australian Greens members of the Parliament of Western Australia
Members of the Western Australian Legislative Assembly
People educated at Guildford Grammar School
University of Western Australia alumni
Academic staff of the University of Western Australia
Perth City Councillors
Independent members of the Parliament of Western Australia
Greens Western Australia politicians